Division No. 13 is a census division in Alberta, Canada. The majority of the division is located in the north-central portion of central Alberta, while the northeast portion of the division is located within northern Alberta. The division's largest urban community is the Town of Whitecourt.

Census subdivisions 
The following census subdivisions (municipalities or municipal equivalents) are located within Alberta's Division No. 13.

Towns
Athabasca
Barrhead
Mayerthorpe
Onoway
Westlock
Whitecourt
Villages
Alberta Beach
Boyle
Clyde
Summer villages
Birch Cove
Bondiss
Castle Island
Island Lake
Island Lake South
Larkspur
Mewatha Beach
Nakamun Park
Ross Haven
Sandy Beach
Silver Sands
South Baptiste
South View
Sunrise Beach
Sunset Beach
Sunset Point
Val Quentin
West Baptiste
West Cove
Whispering Hills
Yellowstone
Municipal districts
Athabasca County
Barrhead No. 11, County of
Lac Ste. Anne County
Thorhild County
Westlock County
Woodlands County
Indian reserves
Alexis 133

Demographics 

See also 
List of census divisions of Alberta
List of communities in Alberta

References 

Census divisions of Alberta